Mimotona is a genus of early insectivorous lagomorph that lived in late Paleocene of China. Four species are described.

Species
Mimotona borealis
Mimotona lii
Mimotona robusta
Mimotona wana

References
Mimotona at paleobiology database

Lagomorphs
Fossils of China
Paleocene mammals
Paleogene mammals of Asia
Fossil taxa described in 1977